Dogan Corneille (born 28 February 1974) is a Dutch football manager and former player, who is the current head coach of Tweede Divisie club Excelsior Maassluis. His position as a player was defensive midfielder.

Football career

Player 
Corneille was a youth player for VVV-Venlo. On 27 Augustus 1994 he played his first games in the senior squad against FC Den Bosch, in a game that Venlo won 4–3. He played five seasons for VVV in the Eerste Divisie, as a base player on the squad and became its captain.  In 1999 he moved to FC Eindhoven, where he played another two seasons in the Eerste Divisie. In 2001 started playing in lower leagues for FC Hilversum, Kozakken Boys, IJsselmeervogels, and BVV Barendrecht. With IJsselmeervogels, Corneille won the national championship for amateurs in 2006. While an active player, he obtained trainer certification and in 2008 joined the technical staff of ASWH. In March 2008, he stopped playing.

Manager 
After Henk Wisman left ASWH for Almere, Corneille served several months as the interim manager of ASWH. In 2009 he became manager of RVVH in the Hoofdklasse, yet resigned after a few months. In 2010, he moved to Hoofdklasse-side Alphense Boys which he coached for three years. In the final year, the club was close to promotion, however it lost in the playoffs against Haaglandia (1–0). The game ended in a riot for which Alphense Boys were punished by the KNVB.

Corneille moved to the Topklasse anyway with his new club Kozakken Boys, who fired him before the end of the season. At that time he had already signed with IJsselmeervogels for the 2014–15 season. He combined the position of managing IJsselmeervogels with assistant manager of Feyenoord U19.

In 2015 he became manager of VV Noordwijk and in 2016 assistant manager at Willem II, supporting manager Erwin van de Looi. In 2018 Corneille became the manager of Excelsior Maassluis in the Tweede Divisie.

Personal 
Corneille is a resident of Rotterdam. He is a younger brother of pianist Glenn Corneille, who died in an accident in 2005.

References 

1974 births
Living people
Dutch footballers
Footballers from Venlo
Footballers from Rotterdam
Association football midfielders
Netherlands youth international footballers
Eerste Divisie players
Vierde Divisie players
VVV-Venlo players
FC Eindhoven players
FC Hilversum players
Kozakken Boys players
IJsselmeervogels players
BVV Barendrecht players
Dutch football managers
ASWH managers
Alphense Boys managers
RVVH managers
Kozakken Boys managers
IJsselmeervogels managers
VV Noordwijk managers
Willem II (football club) managers
Feyenoord non-playing staff
Willem II (football club) non-playing staff